For the Summer Olympics, there are 32 venues that have been or will be used for sailing. Most competitions took place for the early part of the Olympics at or near venues, but no specific yacht or sailing club was listed in the official Olympic report. In 1920, the twelve-foot dinghy event set for Ostend was moved to the Netherlands at special request of the Belgian Olympic Committee. The first specific yacht or sailing club to host the competitions took place in 1968 Summer Olympics in Mexico City though those competitions took place actually in Acapulco. Eight years later in Montreal, the competitions took place on the Great Lakes in Kingston, Ontario, marking the first and only time the sailing competitions took place in freshwater.

During the fifth race of the 1988 Summer Olympic sailing Finn event near Busan, Canada's Lawrence Lemieux was in second place when he noticed Joseph Chan of Singapore in the water  from his capsized boat. Lemieux abandoned his position and rescued Chan and Chan's Singapore teammate. Even though Lemieux finished last in the race, the IOC gave him second place for the race as a result of Lemieux's heroic efforts. Lemieux would be awarded the IOC Pierre de Coubertin medal at the Finn medal awards ceremony by President Juan Antonio Samaranch.

The 1992 Summer Olympic venue was noted for its numerous complaints from the sailors over the debris found at the Olympic Harbor. Among the items found were dead rats and floating refrigerators. It was so bad that Barcelona port authorities, under pressure from the International Yacht Racing Union (International Sailing Federation since August 1996), assigned four garbage vessels to collect garbage daily. In the men's windsurfer event, American Mike Gebhardt got a plastic bag caught on his boardsail in the last lap of the seventh race. Six boardsailers passed Gebhardt before he could dislodge the plastic bag. Gebhardt lost out a gold by 0.4 points over France's Franck David.

References

 
Venues
Sail